Sheikh Cali Sheikh Maxamuud Sheikh Cali Dheere, also known as "Sheekh Cali Dheere", was a Somali cleric and religious fundamentalist based in Mogadishu. He was instrumental in the establishment of the first Islamic courts in Mogadishu in 1996. Often called the Sheikh Ali-Dhere court, it brought together scholars, elders, business leaders and politicians as a reaction to the deteriorating security situation in North Mogadishu, and Siisii street in particular. Its success brought popular support to him, which was used in turn to challenge political leaders of the Muddolod clan, and ended in a clash with Ali Mahdi which eventually brought down the court. Many people confuse between Sheikh Ali Mahmoud better known as Sheikh Ali Dheere who established the first Islamic Courts in Mogadishu in 1996, and another man called Sheikh Ali Dheere who is the spokesperson of the Al Shabaab. The Al Shabaab Leader and speaker is from the  Mursade sub-clan of Hawiye.

References

External links
 Picture of Sheikh Dheere

Somalian religious leaders
Somalian politicians
Living people
Year of birth missing (living people)